The Mongolia national ice hockey team is the national ice hockey team of Mongolia. They are controlled by the Mongolian Hockey Federation and a member of the International Ice Hockey Federation (IIHF) since 15 May 1999. Mongolia participated in several World Championship tournaments from late 2000s to early 2010s, but since 2013, have only played in the Challenge Cup of Asia, a regional tournament for lower-tier hockey nations in Asia.

Mongolia is currently not ranked in the IIHF World Ranking and has not participated in the World Championships since finishing third in the 2013 Division III qualification (October 2012), when the IIHF enacted new "minimum participation standards", stipulating that the country must have at least one functional, full-sized indoor rink.

History
Mongolia made its debut at the 1999 Asian Winter Games. The national team did not participate in any IIHF tournaments until the 2007 IIHF World Championship Division III tournament in Ireland. They played four games, losing all four by a combined margin of three goals for to 45 goals against. In 2008, Mongolia played in the IIHF World Championship Division III tournament in Luxembourg, and again they lost all of their games. Goal margin was 11 goals for and 59 against in five games. In the 2009 tournament, they chose to forfeit the games and withdrew from the tournament. All of the games were marked as 5–0 forfeits towards the team. In 2010, the team was placed in group B of Division III. They started off the tournament against North Korea, and they lost (22–1). Then they lost to South Africa (12–1) and to Armenia (15–0). Goal margin was 2 goals and 49 against. They finished the tournament with a 3rd place rematch against South Africa. Mongolia scored three times, but it was not enough as South Africa won 8–3. Mongolia however finished the tournament with its first-ever podium position, finishing third overall in the group after Armenia was suspended by the IIHF.

Many players also represent the Mongolia national bandy team.

Withdrawal from 2009 and 2011 IIHF tournaments
The Mongolian Hockey Federation announced that their men's and U18 teams would not be participating in the 2011 IIHF tournaments due to financial trouble and lack of ice hockey equipment. Mongolia cancelled their trips to their respective tournaments. Mongolia men's team was scheduled to travel to Cape Town, South Africa to participate in Division III, while the U18 team was scheduled to participate in Division III in Taipei City, Taiwan. They had previously withdrawn from the 2009 Division III tournament as well.

Tournament record

World Championships

Asian Winter Games

Challenge Cup of Asia

Fixture and results

2007

2008

2010

2012

2023
All times are local (UTC+8)

All-time record against other nations
Last match update: 9 March 2019

Note: Mongolia was awarded a 5–0 victory over Armenia in the 2010 IIHF World Championship Division III tournament after Armenia had their statistics and final scores expunged from the IIHF tournaments due to player eligibility issues. The score of the game was originally 15–0 for Armenia.

References

External links
IIHF profile
National Teams of Ice Hockey profile

Ice hockey in Mongolia
National ice hockey teams in Asia
Ice hockey